Qari Syed Sadaqat Ali (Urdu: قارى سید صداقت علی), is a Pakistani qari. He is well known for his program AlQuran (The Quran) that was especially aimed to help children with their reading and pronunciation skills of the Quran. The program was a huge success on the Pakistan Television Corporation channel (PTV) and was replayed many times. One of his teachers was the renowned Sheikh Abdul Basit Abdul Samad

Early life and career
Qari Syed Sadaqat Ali was born in Pakistan. Qari Sadaqat started participating in local and international qiraat competitions (recitation of Quran competitions) at a very early age. He has appeared in 200 contests and won many international Qiraat competitions.

Awards and recognition
 Hilal-i-Imtiaz (Crescent of Excellence) Award by the President of Pakistan in 2020
 Sitara-i-Imtiaz (Star of Excellence) Award by the President of Pakistan in 2015
 Pride of Performance Award by the President of Pakistan 
 1. Qari (reciter) for the Provincial Assembly of the Punjab   
 2. Chairman, Saut ul Qura International, Pakistan    
 3. Qari (reciter) for both Pakistan Television Corporation & Radio Pakistan    
 4. Member, Selection Board for Pakistan Broadcasting Corporation   
 5. Member, Niqabat ul Qura, Republic of Egypt    
 6. Pupil of Internationally famous Qari Abdul Basit 'Abd us-Samad of  Egypt    
 7. Represented Pakistan in World Qirat recitals in Malaysia, Saudi Arabia, Kuwait, United Arab Emirates, Iran, United Kingdom, United States of America and Europe    
 8. Gained second position twice in International Husn-e-Qirat competitions held in Iran    
 9. First Pakistani Qari ever to win first position in International Husn-e- Qirat competition held in Bangladesh    
 10. Broadcasting Al-Quran programme from Pakistani television and Prime TV for the last six years

See also 
Quran
Qirat
Tajweed
Iqra

References

External links
 Qari Syed Sadaqaat Ali on BBC Music website
 Qari Syed Sadaqat Ali @ Guyana, South America, on YouTube

Pakistani television hosts
Pakistani Quran reciters
Living people
Recipients of Sitara-i-Imtiaz
Recipients of the Pride of Performance
Year of birth missing (living people)
Recipients of Hilal-i-Imtiaz